Timtaghène is a rural commune in the Cercle of Tessalit in the Kidal Region of north-eastern Mali. In the census of 2009 the commune had a population of 2,470. The commune is entirely desert and covers an area of approximately 30,000 km2, but it includes the settlements of Alybadine, Darassal, Tadjoudjoult, Tachrak, Tawhoutène, Tin Kar (Timétrine) and Teghaw-Ghawen.

The village of Inabag is located near the well marked as Mabroûk on maps published by Institute Géographique National in Paris.

References

Communes of Kidal Region